Idaea micropterata is a species of geometrid moth in the family Geometridae. It is found in North America.

The MONA or Hodges number for Idaea micropterata is 7119.

References

Further reading

 
 

Sterrhini
Articles created by Qbugbot
Moths described in 1900